The Chhindwara Municipal Corporation is the civic body that governs Chhindwara city in the Indian state of Madhya Pradesh. It is responsible for the civic infrastructure and administration of the city. Chhindwara Municipal Corporation is headed by the Mayor of city and governed by the Commissioner.

References

Municipal corporations in Madhya Pradesh
Municipal corporations in India
Chhindwara